The Craniofacial Society of Great Britain and Ireland (CFSGBI), commonly known as the Craniofacial Society, is a professional organisation and charity dedicated to the study of cleft lip and palate and other craniofacial anomalies based at the Royal College of Surgeons of England in London in the United Kingdom. The Society first convened in 1970 and continued to meet on an ad hoc basis, leading to its formal constitutional establishment in 1985. The Society has since grown in terms of membership and stature and has developed to become the leading professional organisation for cleft health care professionals in the United Kingdom and Ireland.

History 

The origins of the Society can be traced back to 1969 when British orthodontists Arnold Huddart from Stourbridge, West Midlands and Denis Glass from East Grinstead, Sussex met at the first International Congress to be hosted by the American Cleft Palate–Craniofacial Association (ACPA) in Houston, Texas, US and discussed organising a similar meeting in the UK. The following year a conference concerned with cleft lip and palate management was held at Wordsley Hospital in the West Midlands. Following this, orthodontists and surgeons met annually and were later joined by speech and language therapists. Meetings continued in this manner and after an international meeting in Birmingham in 1983, a meeting was held in Wolverhampton in 1985 to consider the future of the Society. Following considerable discussion those present voted to name the organisation The Craniofacial Society of Great Britain – A Society for the Study of Cleft Lip and Palate and other Craniofacial Anomalies. The Society became the Craniofacial Society of Great Britain and Ireland in 1999.

Logo and Motto
The Society logo depicts the tree of knowledge together with the Society motto Dies Diem Docet, which is Latin for "the day teaches the day", meaning that education is never complete.

Membership
Management of patients with cleft lip and palate or craniofacial anomalies require the expertise of a range of healthcare professionals and this is reflected in the membership of the Society. Healthcare professionals with appropriate professional qualifications and a special interest in the field can apply for membership. Today, members can include audiological physicians, audiologists, anaesthetists, cleft network managers, clinical nurse specialists, clinical psychologists, dental technicians, dental therapists, dentists, geneticists, orthodontists, paediatric dentists, paediatricians, radiologists, restorative dentists, surgeons (maxillofacial, paediatric and plastic) and speech and language therapists.

Functions and activities
The Society's main functions are to organise an annual scientific conference, sponsor research, comment on medico-political issues relating to cleft lip and palate service provision, provide an archive of conference material and provide a membership directory.

Annual scientific conference
The Society has held a scientific conference in March or April each year since the first conference in Liverpool in April 1986. This was preceded by pre-constitutional meetings that were held between 1970 and 1983. The 30th conference will be held at the Royal College of Physicians and will hosted by Guy's and St Thomas' NHS Foundation Trust from 16 to 17 April 2015 with a pre-conference special interest group (SIG) meeting on 15 April 2015.

Research and audit
Members of different specialities meet in subcommittees to work on audit and research projects. The Society's audit group established a minimum data set for cleft audit and has funded audit and research workshops. 
In 1989, the Craniofacial Society Anomalies Register (CARE) was developed to record the births of children with craniofacial anomalies.  The Society funded a multi disciplinary committee to oversee CARE, which became the Craniofacial Anomalies Network (CRANE) and is located in the Clinical Effectiveness Unit at the Royal College of Surgeons of England. The Society has provided research grants and provided funding to assist members in attending its conferences and international meetings. The CFSGBI has also funded training initiatives for speech and language therapists and cleft nurse specialists. In 1996 the Society was asked to provide written evidence to the Clinical Standards Advisory Group (CSAG).  The submission highlighted the interdisciplinary nature of the Society and its role in acting as the forum for the presentation and evaluation of research and audit in the field. The Society is now represented in various National Health Service bodies and is consulted for advice by the government and the media. In 1999, the society became a founder member of the Healing Foundation with representation on its board of trustees and research council. This has ultimately led to the Cleft Collective, the world's largest cleft lip and palate research programme as well as other initiatives.

Special Interest Groups
The speech and language therapy special interest group (SIG) was established in 1987 and held a meeting each year immediately preceding the annual conference.  In 1990, the Society began to offer some financial assistance for these meetings and began to provide facilities for speech and language therapy meetings in 1995.  Other speciality groups then developed special interest groups and these meetings now make up an additional day alongside the annual conference with eight special interest groups meeting for the conference in Birmingham in 2013.  The Society also assists in securing guest speakers for these meetings.

Structure and governance
The Society is governed by its Council, which is chaired by the Society's president; the members of council and the president are elected from and by its membership.

Council 
Christine Couhig is Secretary and Joyce Russell is treasurer. Peter Hodgkinson and Helen Extence are co-opted councillors. A rotation of posts exists to ensure council representation from the main specialities. The Society was initially established with four main categories of membership: orthodontics, oral and maxillofacial surgery, plastic surgery and speech and language therapy as well as some members from other specialities. Since 1990 other speciality groups could stand for office and “other” became incorporated into council rotations. Nurses were first part of the “other” group but increasing numbers led to a specific group for nurses in 2003. The centralisation of cleft lip and palate care has meant that the number of surgeons within the membership has declined and from 2015/2016 the categories of maxillofacial surgeon and plastic surgeon will be combined to form the single category of cleft surgeon for council rotations.

President
The president is elected annually. Kate le Maréchal and Jacqueline Smallridge are current presidents and Karine Latter is vice-president elect. The following table is a list of presidents of the Craniofacial Society of Great Britain and Ireland.

Headquarters and Secretariat

Kathleen Randle, Personal assistant to Arnold Huddart, played a vital role in the development and administration of the Society from its inception. She became membership secretary when the society was formally established in 1985 and remained in the role until her retirement in 2002. In 2006 an office and secretariat was established at the Royal College of Surgeons of England in Lincoln's Inn Fields, London.

Honours

Arnold Huddart Medal
The Arnold Huddart Medal was established in 1990 to encourage original and promising research papers at the annual scientific conference. Submissions are judged by a panel consisting of one member from each of the Society's five membership categories and chaired by the vice-president. Submissions are judged by the quality of the presentation, content and handling of the paper's post-presentation discussion. Papers should be of general interest and should aim to be understood by all members of the Society. The medal is usually awarded to a presenter who is aged 40 or younger at the time of presentation and priority is given to sole authors over multi-authored papers.

The presidents Prize
The presidents Prize was introduced in 2011 and consists of a medal and a £100 cash prize. This award is eligible to members of the Society for a verbal presentation at the annual scientific conference that is considered to have made a significant clinical contribution to cleft lip and palate care.

Cleft Lip and Palate Association

The society has maintained a close relationship with the Cleft Lip and Palate Association (CLAPA) and since 1995 the national secretary of CLAPA has been able to be co-opted as a member of the Society and given financial assistance to attend meetings, at the discretion of the president.

See also
Royal College of Surgeons of England
Cleft Lip and Palate Association

References

External links
Official website
Craniofacial Society of Great Britain and Ireland Annual Scientific Conference 2015
Craniofacial Anomalies Network (CRANE)
Cleft Lip and Palate Association (CLAPA)
The Cleft Collective
European Collaboration on Craniofacial Anomalies (EUROCRAN)
The Healing Foundation

1970 establishments in England
1985 establishments in England
Allied health professions-related professional associations
Dental organisations based in the United Kingdom
Surgical organisations based in the United Kingdom
International medical associations of Europe
Health charities in the United Kingdom
Health in the City of Westminster
Organisations based in the City of Westminster
Plastic surgery organizations